Krauthamer is a German language surname. Notable people with the name include:
 Mandy Krauthamer, American physician and public health official
 Peter A. Krauthamer (born 1957), American judge

References 

German-language surnames